Virgo Vibes is an album by American jazz vibraphonist Roy Ayers released on the Atlantic label in 1967.

Reception

Allmusic noted "Long before he switched to playing disco and pop music, Roy Ayers was considered a promising young jazz vibraphonist. This LP, his second as a leader, was one of his finest".

Track listing
All compositions by Roy Ayers except as indicated
 "The Ringer" (Charles Tolliver) - 7:36
 "Ayerloom" (Roy Norman) - 5:19
 "In the Limelight" (Gerald Wilson) - 6:55
 "Virgo Vibes" - 12:49
 "Glow Flower" - 7:48 
 "Mine Royd" - 5:08 Bonus track on CD reissue
 "Number Seven" - 7:45 Bonus track on CD reissue
Recorded at Gold Star Studios, in Los Angeles, CA on January 18, 1967 (tracks 4-7) and NYC on March 6, 1967 (tracks 1-3)

Personnel 
Roy Ayers - vibraphone
Charles Tolliver - trumpet 
Joe Henderson (tracks 1-3), Harold Land (tracks 4-7) - tenor saxophone
Ronnie Clark (Herbie Hancock appearing under a pseudonym) (tracks 1-3), Jack Wilson (tracks 4-7) - piano
Buster Williams (tracks 4-7), Reggie Workman (tracks 1-3) - bass
Donald Bailey (tracks 4-7), Bruno Carr (tracks 1-3) - drums

References 

1967 albums
Roy Ayers albums
Atlantic Records albums